Joe Mahit (born 17 July 1992) is a Vanuatuan judoka. 

He competed at the 2016 Summer Olympics in Rio de Janeiro, in the men's 66 kg but lost to Jayme Mata in the second round.

References

External links
 

1992 births
Living people
Vanuatuan male judoka
Olympic judoka of Vanuatu
Judoka at the 2016 Summer Olympics